T. J. Kilgallon (born 26 June 1961) is an Irish former Gaelic footballer. His league and championship career at senior level with the Mayo county team lasted fourteen seasons from 1980 until 1993.

Career statistics

Honours
 Mayo
 Connacht Senior Football Championship (6): 1981, 1985, 1988, 1989, 1992, 1993
 Connacht Under-21 Football Championship (1): 1980
 All-Ireland Minor Football Championship (1): 1978
 Connacht Minor Football Championship (2): 1978, 1979 (c)

References

 

1958 births
Living people
Gaelic football backs
Irish schoolteachers
Lacken Gaelic footballers
Mayo inter-county Gaelic footballers